Drop To His Death (also published under the title Fatal Descent) is a mystery novel by the American writer John Dickson Carr, who published it under the name of Carter Dickson, in collaboration with John Rhode.  It is a locked room mystery.

Plot summary

A businessman dies in an elevator in such a way that it seems as though no one could have committed the murder.

Fatal Descent by J.D. Carr and Cecil Street (writing as Carter Dickson and John Rhode)

Carr and Street "are such expert mystery-mongers that their collaboration could scarcely fail to produce something extra special in the bafflement line. Fatal Descent is all of that." - The New York Times

"London publisher shot in automatic elevator. Dr. Horatio Glass and Insp. Hornbeam pool wits - and humor - to spot the killer. Neat variation of good old 'hermetically sealed room' problem, with two authors - and their sleuths - working beautifully in harness. Verdict: Top Drawer" - The Saturday Review.

A seemingly impossible murder in a private elevator draws two sleuths to the case. Inspector Hornbeam and Dr. Horatio Glass are at odds from the beginning, each dismissive of the other's theories, thus creating an atmosphere as much of competition as cooperation.

From the novel:

The elevator was perhaps six feet square by eight feet high, with steel walls painted to imitate bronze. Sir Ernest Tallant sat very quietly in the rear right-hand corner. His legs were outthrust stiffly, his back bent a little forward; and the brim of the rakish gray hat shaded his face. He might have been a grotesque parody of Little Jack Horner, if it had not been for the widening bloodstains on the left breast of his jacket. His umbrella lay beside him, also looking oddly childish like his posture. Under each roof corner of the elevator there was a tiny electric light; these four little lights illumined even the wrinkles on the backs of the man's hands, and glittered on the pieces of broken glass.

https://www.fantasticfiction.com/d/carter-dickson/drop-to-his-death.htm

1939 American novels
1939 British novels
British detective novels
American detective novels
Novels by John Dickson Carr
Novels by Cecil Street
Locked-room mysteries
Heinemann (publisher) books